Hermann of Minden was a Provincial superior of the German province of Dominicans in the 13th century.

References 

German Dominicans